The rulers of Futa Toro were Muslim monarchs with the regnal title of Almamy. They ruled the  Almamyate of Futa Toro from the late 18th century into the late 19th century.  It was the first Muslim Fula dynasty of Futa Toro, and it overthrew the pagan Denianke dynasty of the Empire of Great Fulo in 1776/

List of independent Almamys of Futa Toro
 Abdelkedir (1776 – 1804)
 Mustafa (1804 – 1861)
Futa Toro is incorporated into the jihad of Umar Tall

List of Almamys of Futa Toro under Toucouleur Empire
 Mustafa (1861 – 1868)
 Ahmadu Sego (1868 – 1875)
 Abdul Bu Bakar (1875 – 1877)
Futa Toro is incorporated into the Senegal Colony

List of Almamys of Futa Toro as part of the Senegal Colony
 Abdul Bu Bakar (1877–1891)

See also
Empire of Great Fulo
Toucouleur Empire
History of Senegal

Sources

Lists of African rulers
Fula history